Nebraska Highway 71 is a highway in western Nebraska.  Its southern terminus is at the Colorado border south of Kimball, as a continuation of Colorado State Highway 71.  Its northern terminus is at the South Dakota border northwest of Crawford, where it continues as South Dakota Highway 71.

Route description
Nebraska Highway 71 begins south of Kimball at the Colorado border, where it continues from CO 71.  It heads northward from Colorado, intersecting I-80 just to the south of Kimball.  It then runs east, concurrently, with Interstate 80 to the next exit where it heads north as a by-pass along the eastern side of Kimball. Just before it passes over US 30 it has a junction with Link 53E which provides access to US 30.  Further north, the highway meets NE 88 and runs concurrently northward with it for a couple of miles.  N-71 splits off to the north at this point, heading to the northeast to bypass Gering.  East of Gering, it intersects NE 92 and runs concurrently northward with it.  A little to the north, N-71 and N-92 intersect with US 26, and run concurrently to the northwest along it, passing through Scottsbluff.

At the north side of Scottsbluff, N-71 splits off to the north again.  The highway continues north into the Nebraska Sandhills, turning to the northeast and east where it intersects with N-2 west of Hemingford.  Both highways turn north and about  later enter Crawford and intersect US 20.  After leaving Crawford, the highway continues to the northwest, where it runs along the border with South Dakota for about a mile until they terminate at the South Dakota state line with SD 71 south of Ardmore, South Dakota.

Major intersections

References

External links

Nebraska Roads: NE 61-80

071
Transportation in Kimball County, Nebraska
Transportation in Banner County, Nebraska
Transportation in Scotts Bluff County, Nebraska
Transportation in Sioux County, Nebraska
Transportation in Box Butte County, Nebraska
Transportation in Dawes County, Nebraska